Osa Massen (born Aase Madsen Iversen, 13 January 1914 – 2 January 2006) was a Danish actress who became a successful movie actress in Hollywood. She became a naturalized citizen of the United States in 1941.

Background and early career
Born in Copenhagen, Denmark, she began her career as a newspaper photographer, then became an actress. She first came to the United States in 1937. She was recorded as Aase Madsen-Iversen, Danish actress, aged 23, on the manifest of the S/S Normandie, which sailed from Southampton, England, on December 18, 1937, and arrived at the Port of New York on December 23, 1937.

Massen's first film was Kidnapped (1935). She notably appeared as Melvyn Douglas' unfaithful wife dealing with blackmailer Joan Crawford in A Woman's Face (1941). She also appeared as a mysterious woman with something to hide in Deadline at Dawn (1946). She also starred with Lloyd Bridges in the movie Rocketship X-M (1950), the first space adventure of the post-World War II era.

Later in her career, Massen appeared in guest roles on many television programs. She made three guest appearances on Perry Mason. In 1958, she played Lisa Bannister in "The Case of the Desperate Daughter", where she was reunited with her "Master Race" daughter Gigi Perreau, and in 1959, she played Sarah Werner in "The Case of the Shattered Dream". Her last television role was in 1962 when she played Lisa Pedersen in "The Case of the Tarnished Trademark".

Personal life
She was married three times, each with a relatively short duration, including once to Allan Hersholt, the son of Jean Hersholt, on December 15, 1938.

Death
Massen died on January 2, 2006, 11 days before her 92nd birthday, following unspecified surgery in Hollywood, California. Her remains are buried at Westwood Memorial Park in Los Angeles, California with a plaque that lists her name as Osa Massen Vogel.

Filmography

Notes

References

External links

1914 births
2006 deaths
20th-century Danish actresses
American film actresses
American television actresses
Danish emigrants to the United States
Danish film actresses
Actresses from Copenhagen
Burials at Westwood Village Memorial Park Cemetery
20th-century American actresses
Naturalized citizens of the United States
21st-century American women